The Pakistani North-West Frontier Province, now known as the province of Khyber Pakhtunkhwa, after its reinstatement in 1970, was governed by a legislative body known as the Provincial Assembly. Members were elected from 42 constituencies.

See also
Khyber Pakhtunkhwa Assembly

References

  
 

North West Frontier Province
MPAs of the Provincial Assembly of Khyber Pakhtunkhwa by term